The , shortened to Prokino, was a left-wing film organization active in the late 1920s and early 1930s in Japan.  Associated with the proletarian arts movement in Japan, it primarily used small gauge films such as 16mm film and 9.5mm film to record demonstrations and workers' lives and show them in organized events or, using mobile projection teams, at factories and mines.  It also published its own journals.  Most of its films were documentaries or newsreels, but Prokino also made fiction films and animated films.  Prominent members included Akira Iwasaki and Genjū Sasa, although in its list of supporters one finds such figures as Daisuke Itō, Kenji Mizoguchi, Shigeharu Nakano, Tomoyoshi Murayama, Kiyohiko Ushihara, Kogo Noda, Takiji Kobayashi, Sōichi Ōya, Fuyuhiko Kitagawa, Tokihiko Okada, Matsuo Kishi, Kiyoshi Miki, Denmei Suzuki, Teppei Kataoka, and Shigeyoshi Suzuki.  The movement was eventually suppressed by the police under the Peace Preservation Law, but many former members became prominent figures in the Japanese documentary and fiction film industries.

References

External links
 Prokino - Documentary Box (Interview with Katsuo Noto and Shizuo Komori by Mamoru Makino and Aaron Gerow)
 Makino, Mamoru. "Rethinking the Emergence of the Proletarian Film League of Japan (Prokino)." In Praise of Film Studies: Essays in Honor of Makino Mamoru. Eds. Aaron Gerow and Abé Mark Nornes (Kinema Club, 2001).
 Prewar Proletarian Film Movements Collection. Center for Japanese Studies, University of Michigan. Full text of many Prokino publications.
 Prewar Proletarian Film Movements Collection: Films. Center for Japanese Studies, University of Michigan. QuickTime copies of six Prokino films.

Film organizations in Japan
Political art
Japanese political films
1930s in Japanese cinema
Far-left politics in Japan
1920s in Japanese cinema